Underground is a Canadian drama film, directed by Sophie Dupuis and released in 2020. Produced by the Montreal based company Bravo Charlie, the film stars Joakim Robillard as Maxime, a troubled miner in Val-d’Or, Quebec, who must attempt to rescue his coworkers when an explosion happens inside the mine.

The cast also includes Théodore Pellerin as Julien, his friend and former coworker who has suffered from aphasia since being injured in a car accident for which Maxime was responsible, as well as James Hyndman, Guillaume Cyr, Catherine Trudeau, Mickaël Gouin, Chantal Fontaine, Bruno Marcil and Jean L'Italien.

The film entered production in 2019, and was scheduled to premiere at the Festival du nouveau cinéma on October 7, 2020. The event was cancelled due to severe weather. It subsequently had its world premiere screening at the 2020 Whistler Film Festival, where Dupuis won the Borsos Competition award for Best Director of a Canadian Film.

The film was set to be theatrically released in the province of Quebec on April 30, 2021, but due to continued restrictions related to the COVID-19 pandemic in Canada its release was delayed, and the film finally opened commercially on June 4.

Underground was the opening film of the Rendez-vous Québec Cinéma film festival on April 28, 2021.

Synopsis 
Maxime, a young miner from Val-d'Or, faces events that challenge his definition of masculinity. Thanks to the brotherhood he can count on in his working environment, Maxime sets out on his long journey on the road to redemption. But when an explosion erupts underground, the young man, newly graduated in mine rescue, plunges into the mine lair with the firm intention of bringing each of his colleagues back alive.

Accolades

References

External links

Souterrain (version in French with English subtitles) at Library and Archives Canada

2020 films
Canadian drama films
Films directed by Sophie Dupuis
2020s French-language films
Films set in Abitibi-Témiscamingue
Films shot in Quebec
French-language Canadian films
2020s Canadian films